Splendrillia vinki is a species of sea snail, a marine gastropod mollusk in the family Drilliidae.

Description
The length of the shell varies between 8 mm and 12.2 mm.

Distribution
This marine species occurs in the Caribbean Sea off Aruba

References

 De Jong, Kornelis M., and Henry E. Coomans. Marine gastropods from Curaçao, Aruba and Bonaire. Vol. 69. Brill Archive, 1988.
  Fallon P.J. (2016). Taxonomic review of tropical western Atlantic shallow water Drilliidae (Mollusca: Gastropoda: Conoidea) including descriptions of 100 new species. Zootaxa. 4090(1): 1–363

External links
  Tucker, J.K. 2004 Catalog of recent and fossil turrids (Mollusca: Gastropoda). Zootaxa 682:1–1295.
 

vinki
Gastropods described in 1988